Cecil Cook may refer to:
 Cecil Cook (1921–1996), English cricketer more commonly known as Sam Cook
 Cecil Cook (physician) (1897–1985), Australian physician and Chief Protector of Aborigines for the Northern Territory

See also 
 Richard Cecil Cook (1902–1977), Australian judge
 Cecil Cooke (1923–1983), Bahamian sailor
 Cook (surname)